Lac Léré may refer to:

 Lac Léré Department, a department in Mayo-Kebbi Ouest, Chad
 Lac Léré (lake), a lake in Chad